Lazar Pavlović (born 2 November 2001) is a Serbian professional footballer who plays as a midfielder.

Club career
Pavlović was promoted to the senior squad by manager Savo Milošević, receiving the number 10 jersey and playing the full 90 minutes in a 1–1 away draw against Radnički Niš on 15 May 2019, as Partizan reached the final of the Serbian Cup. He signed his first professional contract with the club three days later, penning a three-year deal.

International career
Pavlović has represented Serbia at under-17 and under-19 levels.

Statistics

Honours
Partizan
 Serbian Cup: 2018–19

Notes

References

External links
 
 
 

Association football midfielders
FK Partizan players
AEL Limassol players
People from Obrenovac
Serbia youth international footballers
Serbian footballers
Serbian SuperLiga players
Cypriot First Division players
Expatriate footballers in Cyprus
Serbian expatriate sportspeople in Cyprus
2001 births
Living people
Serbia under-21 international footballers